The Huawei Mate 8 is a high-end Android smartphone produced by Huawei as a part of the Huawei Mate series. It was released on 26 November 2015 in China and globally at Q1 2016.

Android (operating system) devices
Mobile phones introduced in 2015
Huawei smartphones
Discontinued smartphones